Krzysztof Zimnoch (born 6 September 1983) is a Polish professional heavyweight boxer affiliated to the Hetman Białystok Boxing Club. He holds an amateur win over former WBC heavyweight champion Deontay Wilder.

Professional career 
Zimnoch made his professional boxing debut on 20 February 2010 against Keon Graham at the Horseshoe Casino in Hammond, Indiana. He won by KO in round 1. Zimnoch trains in London and was involved in a brawl with fellow Polish heavyweight Artur Szpilka during a press conference.

In May 2013, he defeated Oliver McCall. After a two-year lay-off, Zimonch stopped Nigerian fighter Gbenga Oloukun.

Professional boxing record

{|class="wikitable" style="text-align:center; font-size:95%"
|-
!
!Result
!Record
!Opponent
!Type
!Round, time
!Date
!Location
!Notes

|-
|26
|Loss
|22–3–1
|align=left| Krzysztof Twardowski
|TKO
|2 (6), 0:45
|23 Nov 2019
|align=left|
|align=left|
|-
|25
|Loss
|22–2–1
|align=left| Joey Abell
|KO
|3 (12), 2:10
|9 Sep 2017
|align=left|
|align=left|
|-
|24
|Win
|22–1–1
|align=left| Michael Grant
|KO
|2 (8), 1:22
|22 Apr 2017
|align=left|
|align=left|
|-
|23
|Win
|21–1–1
|align=left| Mike Mollo
|TKO
|7 (10), 3:00
|25 Feb 2017
|align=left|
|align=left|
|-
|22
|Win
|20–1–1
|align=left| Marcin Rekowski
|SD
|8
|22 Oct 2016
|align=left|
|align=left|
|-
|21
|Win
|19–1–1
|align=left| Konstantin Airich
|TKO
|4 (6), 2:36
|28 May 2016
|align=left|
|align=left|
|-
|20
|Loss
|18–1–1
|align=left| Mike Mollo
|KO
|1 (10), 2:08
|20 Feb 2016
|align=left|
|align=left|
|-
|19
|Win
|18–0–1
|align=left| Gbenga Oloukun
|KO
|2 (8), 0:58
|17 Oct 2015
|align=left|
|align=left|
|-
|18
|Win
|17–0–1
|align=left| Art Binkowski
|UD
|8
|19 Oct 2013
|align=left|
|align=left|
|-
|17
|Win
|16–0–1
|align=left| Mateusz Malujda
|UD
|8
|18 Aug 2013
|align=left|
|align=left|
|-
|16
|Win
|15–0–1
|align=left| Oliver McCall
|UD
|8
|18 May 2013
|align=left|
|align=left|
|-
|15
|Win
|14–0–1
|align=left| Damian Trzcinski
|TKO
|1 (6), 1:25
|23 Feb 2013
|align=left|
|
|-
|14
|Win
|13–0–1
|align=left| Ferenc Zsalek
|TKO
|4 (6), 2:30
|2 Dec 2012
|align=left|
|
|-
|13
|Win
|12–0–1
|align=left| Adnan Buharalija
|KO
|1 (6), 1:30
|30 Jun 2012
|align=left|
|
|-
|12
|Win
|11–0–1
|align=left| Ben Nsafoah
|UD
|6
|2 Jun 2011
|align=left|
|
|-
|11
|Win
|10–0–1
|align=left| Vjekoslav Bajic
|KO
|2 (6)
|24 Mar 2012
|align=left|
|
|-
|10
|Win
|9–0–1
|align=left| Gabor Farkas
|UD
|4
|3 Dec 2011
|align=left|
|
|-
|9
|Win
|8–0–1
|align=left| Sebastian Tuchscherer
|TKO
|3 (4), 1:49
|15 Oct 2011
|align=left|
|
|-
|8
|Win
|7–0–1
|align=left| Toni Visic
|RTD
|3 (6)
|16 Sep 2011
|align=left|
|
|- 
|7
|Win
|6–0–1
|align=left| Abdelhadi Hanine
|TKO
|2 (4), 1:47
|23 Oct 2010
|align=left|
|
|-
|6
|Win
|5–0–1
|align=left| Remigijus Ziausys
|UD
|4
|16 Oct 2010
|align=left|
|
|-
|5
|Win
|4–0–1
|align=left| Panjoundoro Nsangou Aouna
|TKO
|1 (4), 1:05
|25 Sep 2010
|align=left|
|
|-
|4
|Win
|3–0–1
|align=left| Michael Moncrief
|TKO
|3 (4)
|29 May 2010
|align=left|
|
|-
|3
|style="background:#abcdef;"|Draw
|2–0–1
|align=left| Joey Montoya
|MD
|4
|30 Apr 2010
|align=left|
|
|-
|2
|Win
|2–0
|align=left| Dustin Hedrick
|TKO
|1 (4), 0:42
|26 Mar 2010
|align=left|
|
|-
|1
|Win
| 1–0
|align=left| Keon Graham
|KO
|1 (4), 2:47
|20 Feb 2010
|align=left|
|align=left|
|- align=center

References

External links

Krzysztof Zimnoch at boxnews.com.ua
Home page at krzysztofzimnoch.pl

1983 births
Living people
Heavyweight boxers
Sportspeople from Białystok
Polish male boxers
20th-century Polish people
21st-century Polish people